2085 Henan, provisional designation , is a potentially slow rotating asteroid and the parent body of the Henan family in the central regions of the asteroid belt, approximately 15 kilometers in diameter. It was discovered on 20 December 1965, by astronomers at the Purple Mountain Observatory in Nanking, China. The asteroid was named for the Henan Province in China.

Orbit and classification 

Henan is the parent body of the Henan family, a large family of L-type asteroids in the intermediate main-belt, which can be further divided into four distinct families.

It orbits the Sun in the central asteroid belt at a distance of 2.5–2.9 AU once every 4 years and 5 months (1,619 days; semi-major axis of 2.70 AU). Its orbit has an eccentricity of 0.09 and an inclination of 4° with respect to the ecliptic.

A first observation of this asteroid was found on a precovery, taken at the Lowell Observatory in July 1906. The body's observation arc begins at Goethe Link Observatory in July 1943, more than 22 years prior to its official discovery observation at Purple Mountain.

Physical characteristics 

In the Bus–DeMeo and SMASS classification, Henan is an uncommon L-type asteroid, which is also the overall spectral type for members of the Henan family.

Rotation period 

As of 2017, no secure rotational lightcurve of Henan has been obtained. In September 2004, observations by Laurent Bernasconi gave a rotation period of 24 hours with a brightness variation of 0.25 magnitude. In February 2015, photometric observations of Henan by an international collaboration of astronomers gave a tentative synodic period of  hours and an amplitude of 0.4 magnitude, which would make it a potentially slow rotator. An alternative period solution gave 94 hours. The latter study selected Henan because it is a suspected "Barbarian" asteroid (named after 234 Barbara) which polarimetric properties suggest that they have an unusual shape and topographic features with large concave areas.

Diameter and albedo 

According to the surveys carried out by the Japanese Akari satellite and the NEOWISE mission of NASA's Wide-field Infrared Survey Explorer, Henan measures between 13.356 and 18.34 kilometers in diameter and its surface has an albedo between 0.10 and 0.2510.

The Collaborative Asteroid Lightcurve Link assumes an albedo of 0.18 and calculates a diameter of 13.67 kilometers based on an absolute magnitude of 11.8.

Naming 

This minor planet was named after the Henan Province in the People's Republic of China, located in the central part of the country along the lower stretch of the Yellow River, which is considered the cradle of civilization in ancient China. The official naming citation was published by the Minor Planet Center on 1 February 1980.

References

External links 
 Asteroid Lightcurve Database (LCDB), query form (info )
 Dictionary of Minor Planet Names, Google books
 Asteroids and comets rotation curves, CdR – Observatoire de Genève, Raoul Behrend
 Discovery Circumstances: Numbered Minor Planets (1)-(5000) – Minor Planet Center
 
 

002085
002085
Named minor planets
002085
19651220